The equestrian program at the 1912 Summer Olympics in Stockholm, included five medal events.  There were individual competitions in dressage, eventing, and show jumping. Team scores were also gathered and medals awarded for teams in the eventing and jumping competitions. Equestrian had been absent from the Olympic program since the 1900 Summer Olympics, making the 1912 Games the second time the sport was featured. Ten nations competed: Belgium, Chile, Denmark, France, Germany, Great Britain, Norway, Russia, Sweden, and the USA. Only Sweden and Germany were able to supply a full team for all three disciplines, with several countries (Belgium, Denmark, France, Great Britain, Norway and the USA) having several riders and horses used in two or even all three disciplines. A total of 88 entries ran in the three events, with 62 riders and 70 horses.

Disciplines

Show jumping
A total of 40 riders from 8 nations contested the jumping event, which consisted of a 15-obstacle, 29-effort course. It had a maximum height of 1.40 meters and width of 4.00 meters, and had to be completes a speed of 400 m/min. Individual and team competitions ran over the same course but were held separately. A maximum of 6 riders per country was allowed in the individual jumping event.

Dressage
The dressage competition had 21 riders from 8 countries. It differed from the current format in that it did not include movements such as piaffe and passage but required five jumps up to 1.10 meters in height and a final obstacle: a barrel that had to be jumped while it was rolled towards the horse. Riders could garner bonus points for riding with one hand.

Eventing
The eventing competition had 7 nations competing with a total of 27 riders. The team event had 3 or 4 riders per nation, who were required to be officers on army mounts. The format differed greatly from what is currently used, being held over 5 days. The first day was a 55 km endurance ride to be completed in 4 hours, which included a 5 km, 12-obstacle cross-country course to be completed in 15 minutes. On the second day the horses were rested before coming out on the third day for a 3500m steeplechase over 10 obstacles, to be completed in 5min and 50 seconds. The fourth day was a jumping test, over a 15-obstacle course with a maximum height of 1.30 metes and 3.00 meters in width. The final day held the dressage test. Each phase could garner up to 10 points.

Medal summary

Participating nations
A total of 62 riders from 10 nations competed at the Stockholm Games:

Medal table

References

Sources
 
 

 
1912 Summer Olympics events
1912
Equestrian sports competitions in Sweden